Peter Marx (1914–1978) was a German stage and film actor. He appeared in many films of the state-controlled studio DEFA in East Germany.

Selected filmography
 Free Land (1946)
 Morituri (1948)
 The Orplid Mystery (1950)
 The Last Year (1951)
 Anna Susanna (1953)
 The Goodies (1959)
 For Eyes Only (1963)

References

Bibliography
 Dieter Reimer. DEFA-Stars. Militzke Verlag, 2004.

External links

1914 births
1978 deaths
German male film actors
German male stage actors
Actors from Cologne